The Battle of Ashmiany was a battle fought on 8 December 1432 at Ashmiany between the armies of Švitrigaila and Sigismund Kęstutaitis, two pretenders to the throne of the Grand Duchy of Lithuania during the Lithuanian Civil War (1432–1438).

Battle 
Švitrigaila with several thousand troops (estimated to total about 40,000) marched out of Polatsk, where he was staying, and took Minsk, Kreva, Ashmiany, and was preparing to attack Vilnius. Sigismund Kęstutaitis' Lithuanian and Samogitian army supported by Masurians from Drahichyn (estimated to total about 20,000) attacked Švitrigaila's Lithuanian and Russian troops supported by Tatars, led by Khan Sayid Ahmad I. Švitrigaila's Livonian Order allies did not arrive in time for the battle.

The battle lasted from morning until evening. At first Sigismund's army was pushed by Švitrigaila's forces about  towards Vilna, but Sigismund Kęstutaitis towards the evening beat and struck back at Švitrigailos forces. Both sides suffered heavy losses. According to the Polish chronicler Jan Długosz, about 10,000 of Švitrigaila's men were killed and 4,000 were captured. Švitrigaila escaped to Polatsk. Former voivode of Vilnius Jonas Manvydas, Jurgis Lengvenaitis ruler of Mstsislaw, Duke Jurgis Gedgaudas and other commanders of his army were taken into captivity.

Aftermath 
Although Sigismund Kęstutaitis won the battle, his army was also weakened and he could not pursue Švitrigaila and end the civil war. The Lithuanian civil war ended with the 1435 Battle of Wilkomierz when Švitrigaila's army was dealt a final defeat.

References 

1432 in Europe
15th century in Lithuania
Ashmiany
Ashmiany
Conflicts in 1432
Military history of Belarus